Postemmalocera is a monotypic snout moth genus described by Hans Georg Amsel in 1955. Its only species, Postemmalocera palaearctella, described by E. Turati, is found in Italy and on Sicily and Malta.

References

Anerastiini
Moths of Europe
Monotypic moth genera
Pyralidae genera
Taxa named by Hans Georg Amsel